Michalis Karlis (born January 8, 2003) is a Greek professional basketball player for the Dornbirn Lions of the Austrian 2. Basketball-Bundesliga. He is a 1.85 m (6'1") tall point guard.

Professional career
Karlis joined the youth programm of AEK Athens in 2018. On August 18, 2021, Karlis signed his first professional contract with AEK. In 7 league games, he averaged 0.8 points in under 4 minutes per contest.

References

External links
The Players Pick Profile 
ProBallers.com Profile
Basketball.eurobasket.com Profile

2003 births
Living people
AEK B.C. players
Greek men's basketball players
Point guards
People from Heraklion (regional unit)